Guillermo Pedro Parada (born 28 September 1967) is an Argentine sailor. He competed in the men's 470 event at the 1988 Summer Olympics.

References

External links
 
 

1967 births
Living people
Argentine male sailors (sport)
Olympic sailors of Argentina
Sailors at the 1988 Summer Olympics – 470
Place of birth missing (living people)
Lightning class world champions
Cadet class world champions
TP52 class world champions
Soto 40 class world champions
World champions in sailing for Argentina